Acacia meisneri is a shrub belonging to the genus Acacia and the subgenus Phyllodineae that is endemic to an area in south western Australia.

Description
It has a funnel-shaped or rounded habit with glabrous branchlets that are usually covered with a fine, white powdery coating. Like most species of Acacia it has phyllodes rather than true leaves. It blooms from November to February but can flower sporadically throughout the year.

Taxonomy
The species was first formally described in 1842 by Johann Georg Christian Lehmann as part of the work Delectus Seminum quae in Horto Hamburgensium botanico e collectione. It was later described by Carl Meissner in 1844 in Plantae Preissianae. It was reclassified as Racosperma meisneri by Leslie Pedley in 2003 then transferred back to genus Acacia in 2006.

Distribution
It is native to an area in the Wheatbelt region of Western Australia where it is commonly found growing in clay, sandy,  loamy and sometimes rocky soils. It is situated throughout the drainage basin of the Avon River from around Goomalling in the north to around Brookton in the south and is situated on plains, along watercourses and on roadsides commonly as a part of Eucalyptus wandoo communities.

See also
List of Acacia species

References

meisneri
Acacias of Western Australia
Taxa named by Carl Meissner
Plants described in 1842